Lisitsa, or Lysytsya, (Russian: Лисица, Ukrainian: Лисиця, Belarusian: Лісіца) means "fox" in several Slavic languages. It may also refer to:

Lisitsa (river), Tomsk Oblast, Russia
8064 Lisitsa, asteroid

People with the surname
Mikhail Pavlovich Lisitsa (1921—2012), Ukrainian physicist
Nataliya Lisitsa (1961—), Russian luger
Valentina Lisitsa (1970—), Ukrainian pianist
Alona Lisitsa (1971—), Ukrainian Rabbi
Ihar Lisitsa (1988—), Belarusian football player

See also
Lisica (disambiguation)

Surnames from nicknames